Tsering Tashi (died 15 October 2020) was a BJP Indian Politician.

Career
He was elected as a Member of Legislative Assembly of Arunachal Pradesh from the Tawang (Arunachal Pradesh) Constituency.

References

Year of birth missing
2020 deaths
People from Tawang district
Arunachal Pradesh MLAs 2019–2024
Independent politicians in India
Arunachal Pradesh MLAs 2014–2019
Place of birth missing
Place of death missing